Pseudopostega denticulata is a moth of the family Opostegidae. It is only known from eastern and western Ecuador.

The length of the forewings is about 2.3 mm. Adults are mostly white. Adults have been collected in January.

Etymology
The specific name is derived from the Latin denticulata (covered with small denticles, pointed) as suggested by the laterally dentate gnathos diagnostic for this species.

External links
A Revision of the New World Plant-Mining Moths of the Family Opostegidae (Lepidoptera: Nepticuloidea)

Opostegidae
Moths described in 2007